Adachi (written: , ,  or  in hiragana) is a Japanese surname. Notable people with the surname include:

, a member of the manga artist duo Adachitoka
, Japanese mixed martial artist
Barbara Adachi, American businesswoman
Chihaya Adachi (born 1963), Japanese physicist
, Japanese ukiyo-e artist
, Japanese ski jumper
, Japanese general
, Japanese footballer
Jeff Adachi (1959–2019), American lawyer
, Japanese warrior, son of Morinaga
, Japanese film director, producer and editor
, better known as Mr. Hito, Japanese professional wrestler
, Japanese slalom canoeist
Ken Adachi (1929–1989), Canadian writer and literary critic
Kenyi Adachi (born 1993), Mexican footballer
, Japanese politician
, Japanese pole vaulter
, Japanese triathlete
, Japanese screenwriter and film director
, Japanese sprint canoeist
, Japanese judge
, Japanese baseball player
, Japanese manga artist
, Japanese warrior
, Japanese actor and singer
, Japanese television personality and actress
, Japanese footballer and manager
, Japanese baseball player
, Japanese water polo player
, Japanese voice actress
, Japanese politician
, Japanese photographer
, Japanese sport wrestler
, Japanese musician
, Japanese baseball player
, Japanese footballer
, Japanese entomologist
, Japanese manga artist and the older brother of Mitsuru Adachi
, Japanese politician
, Japanese musician and songwriter
, Japanese actress and singer
, Japanese synchronized swimmer
, Japanese ice hockey player
, Japanese footballer and manager
, Japanese rapper of K-Pop group Pentagon
Yositaka Adachi (born 1962), Palauan-Japanese Former Governor of Koror State in The Republic of Palau

Fictional characters
, a character in the manga series Yankee-kun to Megane-chan
Lady Masako Adachi, a character in the video game Ghost of Tsushima, with motion-capture provided and voiced by Lauren Tom
, a character in the light novel series Adachi to Shimamura
, a character in the video game Persona 4
, a character in the video game Yakuza: Like a Dragon

See also
Adachi clan, a Japanese samurai clan

References

Japanese-language surnames